Pustin Duz (also Romanized as Pūstīn Dūz) is a village in Pain Rokh Rural District, Jolgeh Rokh District, Torbat-e Heydarieh County, Razavi Khorasan Province, Iran. At the 2006 census, its population was 124, in 24 families.

References 

Populated places in Torbat-e Heydarieh County